Aghion is a surname. Notable people with the surname include:

 Anne Aghion (born 1960), documentary filmmaker
 Gaby Aghion (born 1921), French fashion designer
 Gabriel Aghion (born 1955), French film director
 Philippe Aghion, French economist

Other uses

Beit Aghion - the official residence of the Prime Minister of Israel.